Coming Up for Air is a 1939 novel by George Orwell.

Coming Up for Air may also refer to:

 Coming Up for Air (Breathing Space album), 2007
 Coming Up for Air (Kayak album), 2008
 Coming Up for Air (Davy Knowles and Back Door Slam album), 2009
 Coming Up for Air (Kodaline album), 2015
 "Coming Up for Air", a song by Ainslie Henderson